The buff-banded thicketbird or buff-banded bushbird (Cincloramphus bivittatus) is a species of Old World warbler in the family Locustellidae.
It is found in Indonesia (Timor) and East Timor.

References

Cincloramphus
Birds described in 1850
Taxa named by Charles Lucien Bonaparte
Taxonomy articles created by Polbot
Taxobox binomials not recognized by IUCN